The Big Ones: Greatest Hits Vol. 1 is the first greatest hits album released by Australian country musician Lee Kernaghan. The album was released in October 2004 and peaked at number 16 on the ARIA Charts.
The album was certified platinum in 2007.

Track listing
 "Hat Town"
 "Boys from the Bush"
 "Something in the Water"
 "Goondiwindi Moon"
 "The Way it Is"
 "Leave Him in the Longyard" (with Slim Dusty)
 "She's My Ute"
 "When the Snow Falls on the Alice"
 "High Country"
 "Skinny Dippin'"
 "1959"
 "Gettin' Gone"
 "I'm from the Country" (with Travis Sinclair)
 "Three Chain Road"
 "She Waits by the Sliprails (The Bush Girl)"
 "Texas QLD 4385"
 "Electric Rodeo"
 "The Outback Club"
 "Missin' Slim" (with Colin Buchanan)
 "Down Under" (bonus track)

Charts

Weekly charts

Year-end charts

Certifications

References

2004 greatest hits albums
Compilation albums by Australian artists
Lee Kernaghan albums